Kucher or Kutscher is a surname of German origin meaning "coachman". 

It may refer to following people which first name starts with:
 Oleksandr Kucher (born 1982), Ukrainian footballer
 Karol Kennedy Kucher (1932–2004), American skater
 Alyosha (born Olena Kucher in 1986), Ukrainian singer
 Yana Kucher, ex-member of The Kissing Party

See also
 

Occupational surnames
Surnames of German origin